The Cagle Peaks are a group of sharp peaks that surmount the south end of White Escarpment in the Heritage Range. The group was named by the University of Minnesota geological party, 1963–64, for Major Paul M. Cagle, commanding officer and pilot of the helicopter detachment that assisted the party in the field.

See also
 Mountains in Antarctica

References
 

Mountains of Ellsworth Land